Saravia was the name of the defunct Russian airline Saratov Airlines until 2013.

Saravia may also refer to:

 Hadrian à Saravia (1532-1613), Dutch/British Protestant theologian

The Portuguese surname Saraiva in its Hispanicized form:
 Alejandro Saravia (writer) (born 1962), Bolivian-Canadian writer
 Alejandro Saravia (chef) (born 1983), Peruvian chef
 Alejo Saravia (born 1985), Uruguayan footballer
 Aparicio Saravia (1856-1924), Uruguayan political leader
 Diana Saravia Olmos, Uruguayan notary and politician
 Enrique Saravia (born 1967), Uruguayan footballer
 Renzo Saravia (born 1993), Argentine footballer
 Villanueva Saravia (1964-1998), Uruguayan politician

See also
 Saraiva (disambiguation)